Emerson "Doc" Beauchamp (June 14, 1899 – April 15, 1971) was an American politician from the state of Kentucky. A Democrat, he was elected the 41st Lieutenant Governor of Kentucky in 1951, state Commissioner of Agriculture in 1960, and Kentucky State Treasurer in 1963.

Biography
Isaac Emerson Beauchamp was born in Logan County, Kentucky on June 14, 1899, the son of Isaac Beauchamp and Ella (Offutt) Beauchamp. The Beauchamp family included several doctors, and Beauchamp's parents hoped he would enter the medical profession, so they called him "Doc" from an early age. Beauchamp became a farmer and was involved in politics from an early age, including serving as a legislative page, serving as assistant clerk and clerk of the Kentucky Senate, and winning election to leadership roles on the Kentucky Democratic State Committee. Beauchamp served in the U.S. Army during World War I and World War II and attained the rank of captain.

Beauchamp served as Logan County Clerk (1926-1932) and then Sheriff of Logan County (1938-1941). He was appointed chief clerk of the state senate in 1946 and director of the state department of personnel in 1947. From 1948 to 1951 he was the state's rural highway commissioner. In 1951 he was elected Lieutenant Governor of Kentucky and he served from 1951 to 1955. Beauchamp was a delegate to the Democratic National Conventions in 1952, 1956, 1960, and 1964. From 1960 to 1963 he was Kentucky's Commissioner of Agriculture. He served as Kentucky State Treasurer from 1964 to 1968.

Death and burial
Beauchamp died in on April 15, 1971. He was buried at Maple Grove Cemetery in Russellville, Kentucky.

Family
In 1924, Beauchamp married Elizabeth Orndorff. They were the parents of two sons, Russell and Emerson.

References

1899 births
1971 deaths
United States Army personnel of World War I
United States Army personnel of World War II
Lieutenant Governors of Kentucky
Democratic Party Kentucky state senators
State treasurers of Kentucky
People from Logan County, Kentucky
United States Army soldiers
20th-century American politicians